Chomedahue is a small town located in the Chilean commune of Santa Cruz, Colchagua province.

References 

Communes of Chile
Populated places in Colchagua Province